Pavel Sergeyevich Golovishnikov (born 12 July 1995) is an ice dancer. Skating for Poland with Anastasia Polibina, he is the 2022 Bosphorus Cup champion, 2022 NRW Trophy silver medalist, and 2023 Polish national champion. Earlier in his career, he skated for Russia with Ludmila Sosnitskaia, winning bronze at the 2015 CS Denkova-Staviski Cup.

Career

Early years 
Golovishnikov began learning to skate in 1998. Early in his career, he represented Russia with Ludmila Sosnitskaia. Their partnership started in 2012 and would last seven seasons. They made their junior international debut in November 2012, at the Grand Prize SNP in Banská Bystrica, Slovakia. Their senior international debut came in October 2014, at the Ice Star in Minsk, Belarus.

Sosnitskaia/Golovishnikov competed at a total of five ISU Challenger Series events. In October 2015, the duo won bronze at the 2015 CS Denkova-Staviski Cup in Sofia, Bulgaria. They appeared at five senior Russian national championships, placing seventh twice and ninth three times.

They trained in Moscow, coached by Svetlana Alekseeva, Elena Kustarova, and Olga Riabinina. Their partnership ended following the 2018–19 season.

2020–21 season 
By 2020, Golovishnikov teamed up with Russian-born ice dancer Anastasia Polibina, who had started competing for Poland in 2015. The two decided to train in Toruń, under Sylwia Nowak-Trębacka, and to represent Poland. In December 2020, they became the Polish national silver medalists at the Four Nationals in Cieszyn. They had no appearances at ISU events in their first season together.

2021–22 season 
In October 2021, Polibina/Golovishnikov placed fourth at the Mezzaluna Cup in Italy and then won bronze at the Viktor Petrenko Cup in Odesa, Ukraine. In November, they finished 13th at the 2021 CS Warsaw Cup.

In December, competing at Four Nationals, they repeated as national silver medalists. They were assigned to the 2022 European Championships but withdrew before the event due to a positive test for SARS-CoV-2. They placed 28th at the 2022 World Championships, which took place in March in Montpellier, France.

2022–23 season 
In November, Polibina/Golovishnikov took silver at the NRW Trophy in Germany. In December, they won gold at the Bosphorus Cup in Turkey and then claimed the Polish national title at the Four National Championships hosted by Hungary. They were subsequently nominated to compete at the 2023 European Championships in Espoo, Finland.

Programs

With Polibina

With Sosnitskaia

Competitive highlights 
CS: Challenger Series

With Polibina for Poland

With Sosnitskaia for Russia

References

External links 
 
 
 

1995 births
Living people
People from Belgorod
Polish male ice dancers
Russian male ice dancers
Russian emigrants to Poland